Ernst Valdemar Antevs (November 20, 1888 – May 19, 1974) was a Swedish-American geologist and educator who made significant contributions to Quaternary geology, particularly geomorphology and geochronology. 

Ernst Valdemar Antevs was born on a farm in the Vartofta-Åsaka parish of Skaraborg,  (now Västra Götaland), Sweden.  He attended  Stockholm University where in 1917, he was awarded his Ph.D. in geology.  He was employed as a docent at the University  of  Stockholm from  1917 to  1935.  He  was  also  a  research  associate  for  the American Geographical Society  (1921  to  1922),  the  Carnegie Institution of Washington (between 1922-1940), Geological Survey of Canada (between 1923- 1930),  and  Harvard University  (1924-1926). He moved to the United States during the 1930s and joined investigators from the Gila Pueblo Archaeological Foundation in Globe, Arizona. In 1939, he became a citizen of the United States. Antevs joined the  University of Arizona Department Geochronology in 1957.

Antevs is best known for his contributions to North American quaternary geology as well as his scientific debate with Gerard De Geer, who was his former doctoral advisor. He was also involved in archaeological investigations at Clovis and Gila Pueblo. During May  1965,  the University of Arizona conferred an honorary  Doctor of Science  degree on Ernst Antevs.

Selected works
 Sayles, E.B., and Ernst Antevs (1941) The Chochise Culture (Medallian Papers: Gila Pueblo, Globe, Arizona)

References

External links
Papers of Ernst Valdemar Antev

1888 births
1974 deaths
Stockholm University alumni
20th-century Swedish geologists
Quaternary geologists
Swedish emigrants to the United States
People from Falköping Municipality
University of Arizona faculty
Geoarchaeologists